Udhayanidhi Stalin (born 27 November 1977) is an Indian film producer, actor, and politician who prominently works in the Tamil cinema. He was appointed as Minister for Youth Welfare and Sports Development, Special act implementation Department of Tamil Nadu in the ministry led by his father the chief minister of Tamil Nadu, M. K. Stalin. He is a member of the Tamil Nadu Legislative Assembly, representing the Chepauk-Thiruvallikeni Assembly constituency.

He entered the film industry as a producer and distributor with his production studio Red Giant Movies, making films including Kuruvi (2008), Aadhavan (2009), Manmadan Ambu (2010) and 7aum Arivu (2011). He subsequently made his debut as an actor in the romantic comedy, Oru Kal Oru Kannadi (2012) and has since continued producing and starring in his own films.

Early life and family 
Udhayanidhi Stalin is the son of M. K. Stalin, Chief Minister of Tamil Nadu, and the grandson of former Chief Minister of Tamil Nadu M. Karunanidhi. He attended Don Bosco school and has a  degree in Visual Communications from Loyola College in Chennai. Several of his relatives have been actively involved in politics, and Tamil cinema since the 1950s. His cousins Arulnithi and Dayanidhi Azhagiri are actor and producer, respectively.

Film career 
Udhayanidhi's first film as a producer with Red Giant Movies was Kuruvi (2008), starring Vijay and Trisha. He also produced two films directed by K. S. Ravikumar, Aadhavan (2009) and Manmadan Ambu (2010). He produced AR Murugadoss's science fiction film 7aum Arivu (2011), while also working as a distributor, achieving success through his four 2010 releases: Gautham Vasudev Menon's Vinnaithaandi Varuvaayaa, A. L. Vijay's Madrasapattinam, M. Rajesh's Boss Engira Bhaskaran and Prabhu Solomon's Mynaa.

In 2012, he debuted as a lead actor in M. Rajesh's romantic comedy Oru Kal Oru Kannadi (2012), co-starring with Hansika Motwani and Santhanam. Stalin received positive reviews for his performance of an unemployed youth. Behindwoods noted: "Udhay's portrayal of Saravanan is neat and enjoyable. He scored well in his debut supported Santhanam well in the film", while Sify.com added: "Udhay's debut is promising and hats off to him to underplay his role". Stalin won the Filmfare Award for Best Male Debut for his performance. The success of Oru Kal Oru Kannadi prompted Stalin to continue acting and he appeared in Idhu Kathirvelan Kadhal (2014) and Nanbenda (2015), both films featuring him opposite Nayanthara. He worked on Gethu (2016), with Amy Jackson and then performed in the courtroom drama Manithan (2016), with Hansika Motwani, a remake of the Hindi film Jolly LLB.

In 2017, he has worked in the comedy entertainer Saravanan Irukka Bayamaen from director Ezhil, followed by Podhuvaga Emmanasu Thangam  and action thriller, Ippadai Vellum. Stalin has delivered a decent performance with his share of subtleness. The next project was the drama Nimir (2018), a remake of Malayalam film Maheshinte Prathikaaram directed by Priyadarshan then following the romantic drama, Kanne Kalaimaane.

In 2020, he appeared in Mysskin's Psycho which is a dive into the psyche of a serial killer. In 2022, he play as IPS officer in Nenjuku Needhi, remake of the Hindi film  Article 15. Then, Udhayanidhi starred in Magizh Thirumeni’s generic thriller Kalaga Thalaivan.

Political career

2021 Tamil Nadu Assembly Elections 

Udhayanidhi Stalin's fierce campaign across Tamil Nadu has helped the DMK party secure a major win in the assembly elections. His AIIMS Brick remark changed the course of the Tamil Nadu election campaign.

Udhayanidhi Stalin contested and won in the Chepauk – Thiruvallikeni Assembly Constituency in the 2021 Tamil Nadu Legislative Assembly election.

Chepauk – Thiruvallikeni MLA 
Udhayanidhi Stalin introduced a robotic sewer cleaner in his constituency of Chepauk-Thiruvallikeni for the first time in Tamil Nadu on 21 June 2021.

Udhayanidhi Stalin was nominated as a member of Anna University's Syndicate for a period of three years. The announcement was made by Speaker M. Appavu in the Assembly on 13 September 2021.

Minister 
Udhayanidhi Stalin sworn in as minister in Youth Welfare and Sports Development, in his father’s cabinet in Tamil Nadu on 14 December 2022.

Electoral performance

Personal life 
Udhayanidhi is married to Kiruthiga Udhayanidhi in 2002 and the couple have a son and a daughter. Currently, Kiruthiga heads the lifestyle magazine Inbox 1305. She also directed the film Vanakkam Chennai (2013) for Red Giant Movies and Kaali (2018). His son Inban Udhayanidhi has signed for NEROCA FC football club which plays in the I-League. Udhayanidhi is an atheist.

Filmography

As actor

As producer

As distributor

References

External links 
 

1977 births
21st-century Indian male actors
Dravida Munnetra Kazhagam politicians
Film producers from Chennai
Filmfare Awards South winners
Indian atheists
Indian male film actors
Karunanidhi family
Living people
Male actors from Chennai
Male actors in Tamil cinema
Tamil film producers
Tamil Nadu MLAs 2021–2026